Guyana Tragedy: The Story of Jim Jones, also called The Mad Messiah, is a 1980 television miniseries about the Peoples Temple led by Jim Jones, and their 1978 mass suicide at Jonestown. Based on the book by Charles A. Krause, entitled Guyana Massacre: The Eyewitness Account, the film was originally shown on television on April 15, 1980.

Synopsis
The film draws on Guyana Massacre: The Eyewitness Account and reports from The Washington Post at the time, to describe the life of Jim Jones from a 1960s idealist to the November 1978 mass murder/suicide of members of Peoples Temple in Jonestown, Guyana. In the beginning of the film, Jim Jones is seen helping minorities and working against racism. Later, after a move to San Francisco and increased power and attention, Jones becomes focused on his belief in nuclear holocaust, and moves hundreds of his followers to Guyana. Congressman Leo J. Ryan is notified that some individuals are being held against their will, and after going to investigate, the Guyana tragedy itself is depicted.

Cast
 Powers Boothe as Jim Jones
 Ned Beatty as Congressman Leo J. Ryan
 James Earl Jones as Father Divine
 Randy Quaid as Clayton Richie based on Timothy Stoen
 Meg Foster as Jean Richie
 Linda Haynes as Karen Bundy
 Brad Dourif as David Langtree based on Larry Schacht
 LeVar Burton as Richard Jefferson
 Michael C. Gwynne as Larry King
 Veronica Cartwright as Marceline Jones
 Albert Hall as Otis Jefferson
 Diane Ladd as Lynette Jones
 Diana Scarwid as Sheila Langtree
 Colleen Dewhurst as Mrs. Myrtle Kennedy
 Irene Cara as Alice Jefferson
 Rosalind Cash as Jenny Hammond
 Ron O'Neal as Colonel Robles
 Brenda Vaccaro as Jane Briggs
 Joel Godard as John Briggs
 Clifton James as Charlie Amos, The Barber
 Ed Lauter as Jim Jones Sr.
 David Raynr as Raymond Jefferson

Characters
Jones's family members in the movie are based directly on his own family. The characters of Clayton and Jean Richie are based on Timothy and Grace Stoen (he was a primary Temple attorney and Jones's former right-hand man, she a main organizer for the Temple's "Planning Commission"), and David Langtree on Larry Schacht (the sole doctor at Jonestown), though elements of other Temple members are added to each, and details are changed. Many of the other characters are composites of one or more persons.

The character of Larry King has been likened to Larry Layton, a Peoples Temple member who took part in the assassination of Congressman Leo Ryan.

Production
Though not a documentary in its own right, the film takes the style of a "true life" portrayal of the events. James Earl Jones appears in the film, as spiritual leader Father Divine. The final scenes of the film, with dialog taken from the infamous "Jonestown death tape" (FBI Number Q 042), were produced in a documentary cinematic style, and shot in Puerto Rico and Georgia instead of Guyana. The film was originally broadcast in two parts by CBS Television, on April 15 and 16.

Reception and awards

A 1980 Time magazine review was mostly positive, but criticized the film for spending too much time on earlier parts of Jones' life, stating: "There really is no point in recounting the minutiae of a madman's life if, after four hours, it is still impossible to understand how Jones became a sex-and-drug-crazed megalomaniac or why his misfit followers so easily accepted his larcenous and sadistic behavior." The Time review went on to also note the way Boothe captured the minutiae of the Jim Jones character, and lamented that the film's writer had not made the role more complex for Boothe to portray.

Actor Powers Boothe, who played the role of Jim Jones, won the 1980 Emmy Award for Outstanding Lead Actor in a Limited Series or a Special for his portrayal in the film. Boothe was the only nominated actor in any category to attend the awards ceremony, since the Screen Actors Guild was boycotting the event during a strike. The film was also nominated for Emmy Awards in three other categories, including Outstanding Achievement in Film Sound Mixing, Outstanding Directing in a Limited Series or a Special, and Outstanding Drama or Comedy Special. The film was also nominated for an Eddie Award, for Best Edited Episode from a Television Mini-Series, by the American Cinema Editors.

References

External links

Guyana Tragedy, Yahoo! Movies
Overview page, Rotten Tomatoes

1980 films
1980 drama films
1980s American television miniseries
1980 television films
American biographical drama films
CBS network films
1980s English-language films
Films about religion
Films set in 1978
Films set in Guyana
Films shot in Georgia (U.S. state)
Films shot in Puerto Rico
Works about Jonestown
Drama films based on actual events
American nonlinear narrative films
Films directed by William Graham (director)
Cultural depictions of Jim Jones
Films scored by Elmer Bernstein
American drama television films
1980s American films